Rufus is a city in Sherman County, Oregon, United States. The population was 249 at the 2010 census.  The city was named for an early settler, Rufus Carrol Wallis.

Geography

Climate
This region experiences warm (but not hot) and dry summers, with no average monthly temperatures above 71.6 °F.  According to the Köppen Climate Classification system, Rufus has a warm-summer Mediterranean climate, abbreviated "Csb" on climate maps.

Demographics

2010 census
As of the census of 2010, there were 249 people, 115 households, and 65 families living in the city. The racial makeup of the city was 89.2% White, 5.2% Native American, 5.2% from other races, and 0.4% from two or more races. Hispanic or Latino of any race were 13.3% of the population.

There were 115 households, of which 19.1% had children under the age of 18 living with them, 46.1% were married couples living together, 4.3% had a female householder with no husband present, 6.1% had a male householder with no wife present, and 43.5% were non-families. 38.3% of all households were made up of individuals, and 17.4% had someone living alone who was 65 years of age or older. The average household size was 2.17 and the average family size was 2.89.

The median age in the city was 51.1 years. 16.9% of residents were under the age of 18; 6.3% were between the ages of 18 and 24; 16.8% were from 25 to 44; 34.8% were from 45 to 64; and 24.9% were 65 years of age or older. The gender makeup of the city was 52.6% male and 47.4% female.

2000 census
As of the census of 2000, there were 268 people, 133 households, and 82 families living in the city. The population density was 224.3 people per square mile (86.2/km). There were 162 housing units at an average density of 135.6 per square mile (52.1/km). The racial makeup of the city was 91.04% White, 3.36% Native American, 0.37% Asian, 3.73% from other races, and 1.49% from two or more races. Hispanic or Latino of any race were 6.72% of the population.

There were 133 households, out of which 15.0% had children under the age of 18 living with them, 52.6% were married couples living together, 4.5% had a female householder with no husband present, and 38.3% were non-families. 35.3% of all households were made up of individuals, and 15.0% had someone living alone who was 65 years of age or older. The average household size was 2.02 and the average family size was 2.52.

In the city, the population was spread out, with 14.9% under the age of 18, 7.5% from 18 to 24, 19.8% from 25 to 44, 31.3% from 45 to 64, and 26.5% who were 65 years of age or older. The median age was 50 years. For every 100 females, there were 112.7 males. For every 100 females age 18 and over, there were 117.1 males.

The median income for a household in the city was $26,875, and the median income for a family was $29,688. Males had a median income of $28,500 versus $21,250 for females. The per capita income for the city was $16,801. About 11.5% of families and 13.5% of the population were below the poverty line, including 27.8% of those under the age of eighteen and 2.6% of those 65 or over.

References

External links

Entry for Rufus in the Oregon Blue Book

Cities in Oregon
Cities in Sherman County, Oregon
Oregon populated places on the Columbia River
1965 establishments in Oregon